Parmulini is a tribe of minute hooded beetles in the family Corylophidae. There are at least 2 genera and more than 40 described species in Parmulini.

Genera
These two genera belong to the tribe Parmulini:
 Arthrolips Wollaston, 1854
 Clypastraea Haldeman, 1842
 Clypastrea Haldeman, 1842

References

Further reading

External links

 

Corylophidae
Articles created by Qbugbot